Greatest Hits Radio (Lancashire) is an Independent Local Radio station based in Manchester, England, owned and operated by Bauer as part of the Greatest Hits Radio network. It broadcasts to Lancashire and North West England.

As of June 2022, the station has a weekly audience of 23,000 listeners according to RAJAR.

History

The radio station launched as Red Rose Radio on 5 October 1982 at 6:00am on 301 metres medium wave (999 kHz) and 97.3 VHF stereo, broadcasting from a converted church (St Paul's) at St. Pauls Square in Preston, Lancashire. The station's first presenter on air was Dave Lincoln - the first record played was "Evergreen" by Barbra Streisand. Other early presenters on the station included Dave Lincoln, Allan Beswick, Sally Moon, Derek Webster, Keith Macklin, Russell Harty and Steve Collins. At this point it was owned by Trans World Communications.

On 1 June 1990, Red Rose Radio split into two stations - the FM service became Red Rose Rock FM (now known as Rock FM, while the AM service became Red Rose Gold playing music from the 1960s to the 1980s, as well as airing other specialist shows. Programming director John Myers hired Colin Lamont, under his on-air pseudonym Scottie McClue, to present the late-night phone-in.

In 1994, Red Rose Gold and Red Rose Rock FM were bought by the Emap group. Towards the mid to late 1990s, Red Rose Gold became Red Rose 999, before morphing into Magic 999 to fall in line with all other Emap-owned AM stations which had all been renamed Magic.
Networking at the station was introduced in late 2001 when mid-morning, evening and overnight shows from Magic 105.4 in London begun simulcasting. Towards the end of 2002, listeners were told to contact a special hotline to voice their views about what they think of the station. Around the same time, forthcoming changes to the station were announced such as new programming, a broader music policy and introducing dedicated newsreaders (rather than the local presenters having to be newsreaders, as was the case for a few months). These changes came into effect on Monday 6 January 2003. More locally produced programming was introduced although output from Newcastle, Manchester and Liverpool continued to feature in the station's schedule.

From July 2006, more networking was introduced across the Northern Magic AM network which meant only 4 hours a day was to be presented from the local studios, between 06:00 and 10:00am. In April 2012 Magic 999, inline with the majority of other Magic North stations, dropped local weekend breakfast shows.

Between March 2013 and December 2014, weekday breakfast was syndicated from Piccadilly Magic 1152 in Manchester. No programming originates from local studios in Preston, apart from local news and traffic bulletins.

On 5 January 2015, Magic 999 was rebranded as Rock FM 2 as part of a revamp of the Bauer network and all programming is networked with the other Bauer AM stations in the North although local news, weather and travel continue to be broadcast as opt-outs during the day. Despite the station's new name, it does not broadcast on FM.

On 7 January 2019, Rock FM 2 was rebranded again as Greatest Hits Radio.

In February 2021, Bauer announced it would close GHR's medium-wave service on 999 kHz by the end of April 2021, marking the end of 47 years of broadcasting on the former AM frequency for Red Rose Radio.

References
 Lancashire entry on Aircheck UK

External links

Bauer Radio
Radio stations in Lancashire
Radio stations established in 1982
Bauer City network
1982 establishments in England